Ashley Jackson (born 1940) is an English landscape watercolourist. Raised in Barnsley, then in the West Riding of Yorkshire, he opened his first gallery in 1963. He lives in the town of Holmfirth, near Huddersfield, where his gallery is also located.

Career
Jackson's artworks have been exhibited internationally. Jackson was honoured when one of his original watercolours was presented to Bill Clinton, an avid art collector.

Jackson has been featured on television programmes, including a series about him that ran on PBS from 1984 to 1988 entitled Ashley Jackson's World of Art; a documentary on Jackson in 1981 entitled Once in a Lifetime - My Own Flesh and Blood; and in 2000, a celebratory program entitled Some Days are Diamond in recognition of Jackson's sixtieth birthday and his contribution to the arts. Jackson also presented the television show A Brush With Ashley for nine series between 1990 - 2001. He also appeared in The Last of the Summer Wine episode "A Loxley Lozenge" https://www.imdb.com/title/tt0839120/

Ashley Jackson is also involved with the annual Walker Morris' calendar competition, which rases funds for the Martin House Children's Hospice.

Honours
Jackson was honoured as a Yorkshire Icon, recognising him as a uniquely important and inspirational person to the people of Yorkshire. In addition, in 2009, Yorkshire Bank introduced a debit card decorated with an original painting by Jackson to commemorate their 150th anniversary. Jackson praised the card by stating, "Customers will genuinely have a piece of Yorkshire in their pocket – representing Yorkshire and art wherever they use the card, be it New York, London or Newcastle." To convey his love for Yorkshire, he further added, "The greatest thing about it is Yorkshire, the county of Yorkshire, has helped me to where I am today."

Books
Jackson has also published a number of books about his technique and style.
 2006, 50 Golden Years – Dalesman 
 2000, Ashley Jackson's Yorkshire Moors- A love Affair - Dalesman
 1994, Painting the British Isles -a watercolourists journey - Boxtree
 1993, A Brush With Ashley - Boxtree
 1992, 'Painting in the Open Air' - Harper Collins
 1981, My Brush With Fortune - Secker and Warburg
 1981, Ashley Jackson’s Worlds of Art - vol. 1,2 & 3 Alexander Art Corporation
 1981, An Artists Notebook

References

http://www2.tate.org.uk/40artists40days

http://www.yorkshirepost.co.uk/news/features/ashley_jackson_my_life_in_art_video_1_2581076

External links
http://www.ashley-jackson.co.uk

1940 births
Living people
20th-century English painters
English male painters
21st-century English painters
People from Barnsley
20th-century English male artists
21st-century English male artists